Kaatrukkenna Veli is a 2001 Indian Tamil-language war drama film directed by Pugazhendhi Thangaraj. The film stars Sujitha and Sriman, with Khushbu, C. Arun Pandian, Chandrasekhar, Sudhangan, Sakthi Kumar, Arulmani, Kalairani, Diana and Premi playing supporting roles. The film, produced by T. Vellaiyan, was released on 14 November 2001.

Plot 

Manimekalai is a young LTTE rebel fighter. During a battle in Valvettithurai (northeast coast of Sri Lanka), she is seriously injured in the leg. A small group of rebels take her on a boat and are headed to India. They land in Point Calimere (India). With the help of an Indian Tamil intermediate, they reach a hospital in Nagapattinam.

The doctor Subhash Chandra Bose, also known as Subhash, first refuses to treat Manimekalai because it is an illegal matter. After seeing her leg's condition, he finally accepts to operate her but Manimekalai does not want to have her leg amputated. It was a sensitive case, the doctors successfully operate her leg but it's only temporary. Her leg could be at any time collapsed and she could die of it. Subhash doesn't understand why she risks her life for her leg and she tells him her past.

In the past, Manimekalai was a cheerful and careless girl. After failing a class twice, she left school. One day, the disabled woman Lakshmi had just moved in next door. Lakshmi and Manimekalai became good friends and spent time singing songs. Everything went well until a LTTE soldier got killed by Sri Lanka Army in Lakshmi's home. Thereafter, the army started to threaten them, Manimekalai ran away from the place while Lakshmi stayed there. The same night, Lakshmi set herself on fire. Later, Manimekalai joined the LTTE.

After listening to her tragic past, Subhash promises her to not call the police and he accepts to let her in the hospital ward for a month. The Tamil Nadu police receive very often information letters from the Sri Lankan government and this time it's about the rebel group staying in a hospital. What transpires later forms the crux of the story.

Cast 

Sujitha as Manimekalai
Sriman as Dr. Subhash Chandra Bose aka Subhash
Khushbu as Lakshmi
C. Arun Pandian as LTTE fighter
Chandrasekhar as Mohamed Sherif
Sudhangan as Murali
Sakthi Kumar as Yoganathan
Arulmani as Bhagavathi Pandian
Kalairani as Subhash's mother
Diana as Shiba
Premi as Manimekalai's mother
Ruban George as Police officer

Soundtrack 
The film score and the soundtrack were composed by Ilaiyaraaja, with lyrics written by Subramania Bharati.

Release and reception 
The film was initially banned by the Censor Board because of its sympathetic portrayal of the LTTE, and negative portrayal of Sri Lankan soldiers. Malathi Rangarajan of The Hindu wrote, "The way the story has been dealt with is quite interesting — till the last few scenes when the proceedings drag". Malini Mannath of Chennai Online opined that "Writer-director Pugazhendi Thangaraj's 'Kaatrukkenna Veli' comes as a whiff of fresh air". Visual Dasan of Kalki rated the film "above average".

See also 
 Portrayals of Sri Lankan Tamils in Indian cinema

References

External links 
 

2000s Tamil-language films
2000s war drama films
2001 films
Films about the Sri Lankan Civil War
Films scored by Ilaiyaraaja
Indian war drama films